Sergio Mihanovich (Buenos Aires, May 8, 1937 – May 7, 2012) was an Argentine jazz pianist, singer and composer. He is the uncle of Argentine singer and actress Sandra Mihanovich.

His best known composition is "Sometime Ago", which has been recorded instrumentally by Cannonball Adderley, Bill Evans, Art Farmer, Stan Getz, Joe Pass, George Shearing, Clark Terry, and numerous others. There are also vocal versions by singers including June Christy, Mark Murphy, Roseanna Vitro, Norma Winstone, and Irene Kral.

References 

Argentine jazz musicians
1937 births
2012 deaths